Hubert Hamer is the top official of the U.S. National Agricultural Statistics Service (NASS), the agency that produces most official U.S. government statistics on agriculture and food.

Hamer has been at NASS since the 1990s and was made Administrator in 2016. He had worked in several field offices, then became an administrator of field offices, then became director of NASS's Statistics Division and chair of the USDA's Agricultural Statistics Board.  He is NASS's first African-American administrator.

Early life and education 
Hamer grew up on a farm in Benton County, Mississippi and later lived in Grand Junction, Tennessee. He received a bachelor's degree from Tennessee State University in agricultural science in 1980.

References 

American civil servants
Tennessee State University alumni
Place of birth missing (living people)
Year of birth missing (living people)
United States Department of Agriculture officials
African-American government officials
People from Benton County, Mississippi
People from Grand Junction, Tennessee
Living people
Obama administration personnel
Trump administration personnel